Charles Claude "Casey" Jones (June 2, 1876 – April 2, 1947) was an American professional baseball center fielder who played in Major League Baseball (MLB) for the Boston Americans, Chicago White Sox, Washington Senators, and St. Louis Browns.

A fine defensive player with a strong arm, Jones entered the majors in 1901 with the Boston Americans, playing for them one year before joining the Chicago White Sox (1904), Washington Senators (1905–1907) and St. Louis Browns (1908). Strictly a line-drive hitter and good base runner, he was a utilityman, playing in all infield and outfield positions except third base. His primary position was at center field, where he appeared in 443 of his 483 major league games. His most productive season came in 1906 for Washington, when he posted career-numbers in hits (120), triples (11) and stolen bases. In 1905, he collected 441 outs to rank 8th among American League outfielders.

In a six-season career, Jones was a .233 hitter (420-for-1799) with five home runs and 144 run batted in, including 217 runs, 56 doubles, 28 triples, and 100 stolen bases. He also posted a collective .967 fielding percentage in 1137 chances.

Jones died in Two Harbors, Minnesota at age 70.

References

External links

 Retrosheet

1876 births
1947 deaths
Boston Americans players
Chicago White Sox players
St. Louis Browns players
Washington Senators (1901–1960) players
Major League Baseball center fielders
Baseball players from Pennsylvania
Minor league baseball managers
Chatham Reds players
London Cockneys players
Saginaw Braves players
Detroit Tigers (Western League) players
London Tecumsehs (baseball) players
Denver Grizzlies (baseball) players
St. Paul Saints (AA) players
Winnipeg Maroons (baseball) players
People from Butler, Pennsylvania